Jazmín Beccar Varela (born 28 April 1986) is an Argentine actress, probably best known as in Luján Linares in television series Rebelde Way.

Personal life
Jazmín Beccar Varela has three sisters, named Felicitas, Camila, and Paz Beccar Varela. She cites Hugh Grant and Jennifer Aniston as her favourite actors, and Harry Potter series as her favourite books. Beccar Varela is a fan of hockey.

Career
In 2002, Beccar Varela landed the role of Luján Linares in teenage soap opera Rebelde Way, created by famous Argentine producer Cris Morena. She has since become a popular teenage actress in Latin America, Europe and Israel. Beccar Varela appeared in several music videos by Erreway, a music group formed during the making of Rebelde Way. In 2005, Beccar Varela co–starred her Rebelde Way fellow Camila Bordonaba in soap opera El Patrón de la Vereda. Two years later, in 2007, she appeared in television series Romeo y Julieta as Malena Arizmendi, and also provided the song "Muriendo de Amor" to the series soundtrack album. And Patito Feo

Filmography

Discography

References

External links
 

1986 births
21st-century Argentine women singers
Argentine telenovela actresses
Argentine television actresses
Living people
Actresses from Buenos Aires
Singers from Buenos Aires
Argentine child singers
21st-century Argentine actresses